Émile Antonio (22 April 1928 – 20 September 2022) was a French footballer who played as a midfielder.

Career 
Born in Auzat-la-Combelle in 1928 to emigrants, Antonio became a French citizen in 1931. Having made his debut at his local club, La Combelle CCA, Antonio joined Sète.

Antonio spent the 1953–54 season at Nice, making 28 appearances scoring 3 goals. With Nice, he also won the 1953–54 Coupe de France thanks to a 2–1 win in the final against Marseille, before moving to Olympique Lyonnais.

He stayed at Lyon for seven seasons. He played 183 matches (of which 160 were league games) and scored 23 goals. He is still a well-renowned player at Gerland.

In 1961, he finished his professional career. He played at Montferrand, before returning to his first club, La Combelle CCA. He coached this club between 1963 and 1975.

Later life and death 
In June 2022 Antonio's hometown Auzat-la-Combelle named its stadium after him as a tribute.

Antonio died on 20 September 2022, at the age of 94.

Honours 
Nice
 Coupe de France: 1953–54

References

External links
 

1928 births
2022 deaths
Sportspeople from Puy-de-Dôme
French footballers
Association football midfielders
FC Sète 34 players
OGC Nice players
Olympique Lyonnais players
AS Montferrand Football players